Romincka Forest, also known as Krasny Les or Rominte Heath, is an extended forest and heath landscape stretching from the southeast of Russian Kaliningrad Oblast to the northeast of Polish Warmian-Masurian Voivodeship.

Etymology
The Polish and German names of the forest, like the Rominta/Rominte river and the settlement of Rominty/Rominten, are derived from the Lithuanian syllable rom, meaning calm, as the forest is in the land called Lithuania Minor. The Russian name, Krasnyy Les, means "Red Forest".

Geography
The southern Polish part (about one-third of the area) comprises a protected zone known as Puszcza Romincka Landscape Park.

The Krasnaya River flows through the Romincka Forest. Major settlements in the area include Krasnolesye in Kaliningrad Oblast, as well as Żytkiejmy and Gołdap in Poland.

Flora
The forest is part of the Central European mixed forests ecoregion. Trees in the Polish part of the forest are 40% spruce, 22% oak, 19% pine, 11% birch, 6% alder, and 2% linden and other species. Common plant communities include Tilio-Carpinetum forest on dry ground, composed of oak, spruce, linden, ash, alder, maple, elm, hornbeam, and birch. Undergrowth is generally sparse. Fraxino-Alnetum forest is found in marshy areas, with alder, spruce, linden, ash, and, less frequently, elm. Understory shrubs include bird cherry (Prunus padus), hazel, guelder rose, and saplings of canopy trees. Ground-elder (Aegopodium podagraria) and nettle (Urtica dioica) are common in the ground layer.

History

Part of the East Prussian historic region, the extended forests were known for its red deer populations and became a popular hunting ground of the Hohenzollern princes ruling the Duchy of Prussia since 1525. Part of the German Empire from 1871 onwards, a vast premise in Rominter Heide was purchased by Emperor Wilhelm II, who had his Rominten Hunting Lodge erected here in 1891, including a chapel dedicated to Saint Hubertus. Hunt scenes were perpetuated by notable painters such as Richard Friese (1854–1918).

Plundered by Russian forces in World War I, the hunting lodge and grounds upon Wilhelm's resignation in 1918 were administrated by the Free State of Prussia; Minister-President Otto Braun was a regular guest. Later on, the estates were seized by Nazi minister Hermann Göring, whose Reichsjägerhof Rominten was built nearby in 1936. It also served as Göring's headquarters during the German Operation Barbarossa in 1941.

The Allied Potsdam Agreement after World War II divided the region between the re-established Polish Republic and the Soviet Union. The German history of the region is documented at the East Prussian Regional Museum in Lüneburg and at the German Hunting and Fishing Museum in Munich. In recent years, hunting tourism has again become popular.

References

Central European mixed forests
Forests of Poland
Forests of Russia
Biota of Poland
Biota of Russia
Geography of Kaliningrad Oblast
Geography of Warmian-Masurian Voivodeship